Vancouver Harbour Flight Centre, Vancouver Harbour Water Aerodrome or Vancouver Coal Harbour Seaplane Base , is a registered aerodrome located at Coal Harbour in Vancouver, British Columbia, Canada. The flight centre is within walking distance of the HeliJet heliport and Waterfront Station, a public transit hub in Downtown Vancouver.

After five years of preparation, consultation and construction, Vancouver Harbour Flight Centre seaplane terminal opened for passenger service on May 25, 2011. The Vancouver Harbour Flight Centre is a partnership between the Clarke Group of Companies and Ledcor Group of Companies.

It is classified as an aerodrome and as an airport of entry by Nav Canada. It is staffed by the Canada Border Services Agency (CBSA). CBSA officers at this airport can handle general aviation aircraft only, with no more than 15 passengers.

Control tower

The Vancouver Harbour Control Tower is the only one in Canada specifically for a water aerodrome. In 2009 the airport handled 54,741 aircraft movements, the 35th busiest in Canada. It is also the 8th busiest aerodrome in BC and the busiest water aerodrome in Canada. Itinerant aircraft movements (from one airport to another) for the aerodrome were 54,711 while local movements were 30.

Operations

This part of Burrard Inlet is listed by Nav Canada as a restricted area and no aircraft are permitted to take off, land or move through the zone at a high speed. Just north of Canada Place is a rectangular section called "Area Alfa", centered on the official coordinates, which is the main aircraft operating zone.

In 2007, the link to Victoria Inner Harbour Airport was, according to the Official Airline Guide, Canada's busiest air route by the number of weekly flights.

Airlines and destinations

See also
 List of airports in the Lower Mainland

References

External links

CXH - Vancouver, British Columbia (Coal Harbour SPB)

Airports in Greater Vancouver
Seaplane bases in British Columbia
Registered aerodromes in British Columbia